Daniel Franklin Davis (September 12, 1843 – January 9, 1897) was an American politician and the 37th Governor of Maine.

Early life
Davis was born in Freedom, Maine, on September 12, 1843. He entered the East Corinth Academy in 1863 but after a few weeks he enlisted in the Union Army to fight in the Civil War.

Davis served in the 1st District of Columbia Cavalry Regiment and the 1st Maine Volunteer Cavalry Regiment, and attained the rank of corporal in the 1st Maine Cavalry's Company F.

He then studied at the Corinna Academy, and at the Wesleyan Seminary in Kents Hill, Maine.  He studied law, was admitted to the bar in 1869, and established his law career in East Corinth.

Politics
Davis became a member of the Maine House of Representatives in 1871.  He held that position for four years.  He then became a member of the Maine Senate in 1875.  He held that position until 1879.  In 1879, he was nominated for the governorship by the Maine Republican Party.  In the general election no candidate received a majority of the vote, so the election moved to the Legislature, which selected Davis.  He served from January 17, 1880, to January 13, 1881.  During his administration, the enforcement of the prohibition law was contested.  Davis was not successful in his re-election bid.

Later life
After leaving office, Davis served as the federal collector of customs for the port of Bangor from 1882 to 1886.  He died in Bangor on January 9, 1897, and was buried at Corinthian Cemetery in Corinth.

Family
In 1867, Davis married Laura B. Goodwin of East Corinth; they were the parents of eight children, five of whom lived to adulthood.

References

Sources

Books

External sources
 Sobel, Robert and John Raimo. Biographical Directory of the Governors of the United States, 1789-1978. Greenwood Press, 1988. 

1843 births
1897 deaths
People from Freedom, Maine
People from Corinth, Maine
Politicians from Bangor, Maine
Union Army soldiers
People of Maine in the American Civil War
Maine lawyers
Republican Party members of the Maine House of Representatives
Republican Party Maine state senators
Republican Party governors of Maine
19th-century American politicians
Kents Hill School alumni
19th-century American lawyers